The Alton Blues were a minor league baseball team based in Alton, Illinois. In 1917, the Blues played as members of the Class B level Illinois-Indiana-Iowa League, hosting home games at Sportsman's Park. The league folded during the 1917 season with the Blues in last place.

History
Minor league baseball began in Alton, Illinois in 1917. The Alton "Blues" became members of the eight–team, Class B level Illinois-Indiana-Iowa League. The Blues replaced the Davenport Blue Sox in the league, which was nicknamed the "Three–I League." Alton was joined by the Bloomington Bloomers, Hannibal Mules, Moline Plowboys, Peoria Distillers,  Quincy Gems, Rockford Rox and Rock Island Islanders in the beginning league play on May 3, 1917.

The Blues were so named, simply because of blue trim on their uniforms.

On July 8, 1917, in the midst of World War I, the Illinois–Indiana–Iowa League League received approval to cease play. The Alton Blues were in last place with a record of 18–44, playing under managers Harry Bay and Jim Duggan when the league folded. 8th place Alton finished 23.0 games behind the 1st place Peoria Distillers. The Alton Blues finished behind Peoria (43–23), Rockford Rox (39–21), Hannibal Mules (39–27), Rock Island Islanders (36–26), Moline Plowboys (27–38), Quincy Gems (27–38) and Bloomington Bloomers (25–37) in the 1917 league standings.

After the Illinois–Indiana–Iowa League League shortened the 1917 season, the league did not play in 1918 due to World War I, with many minor leagues folding during for the 1918 season. The Illinois–Indiana–Iowa League returned in 1919 as a six–team league, but without Alton and a lineup of the Bloomington Bloomers, Evansville Evas, Moline Plowboys, Peoria Tractors, Rockford Rox and Terre Haute Browns. Alton, Illinois has not hosted another minor league team.

In 2021, organized baseball returned to Alton, Illinois as the Alton River Dragons franchise began play. The River Dragons became members of the Prospect League, a summer collegiate baseball league.

The ballpark
The 1917 Alton Blues were noted to have played minor league home games at Sportsman's Park. While the Alton Blues played there, it was nicknamed "Three-I League Park." The ballpark was built in 1911. Today, the Alton Police Department occupies the site. The location is 1700 East Broadway, Alton, Illinois.

Year–by–year record

Notable alumni
Harry Bay (1917, MGR) 2× AL stolen base leader 
Jim Duggan (1917, MGR)
Frank Fletcher (1917)
 Bill Cristall (1917)
Mickey O'Neil (1917)

See also
Alton Blues players

References

External links
Alton - Baseball Reference

Defunct minor league baseball teams
Illinois-Indiana-Iowa League teams
Alton, Illinois
Professional baseball teams in Illinois
Defunct baseball teams in Illinois
Baseball teams established in 1917
Baseball teams disestablished in 1917